Rugby in Russia may refer to:

Rugby union in Russia
Rugby league in Russia